I Remember Thelonious is a live album by soprano saxophonist Steve Lacy and pianist Mal Waldron recorded in Italy in 1992 and released on the Nel Jazz label.

Reception
The Allmusic review by Ken Dryden awarded the album 3 stars, stating: "Waldron makes the best of the situation and provides superb accompaniment for Lacy's adventurous flights as well as offering his trademarked dark but fascinating solos... This is a fascinating if not quite essential CD by Steve Lacy and Mal Waldron."

Track listing
All compositions by Thelonious Monk except as indicated
 "Monk's Dream" – 6:23  
 "Reflections" – 7:13  
 "Epistrophy" – 6:15  
 "Mysterioso" – 7:08  
 "Let's Call This" – 6:35  
 "'Round Midnight" – 9:19  
 "Evidence" – 4:50  
 "Well You Needn't" – 3:09  
 "I'll Keep Loving You" (Bud Powell) – 9:10
Recorded at the Jazz in' It Festival in Vignola, Italy on June 28, 1992

Personnel
Steve Lacy – soprano saxophone 
Mal Waldron – piano

References

1996 live albums
Mal Waldron live albums
Steve Lacy (saxophonist) live albums